Muḥammad Mu’nes Awadh (born 5 October 1956) is an Egyptian historian who was born in Assiut Governorate.

Education 
 Bachelor of Arts in History With Honours (the first of his batch) – College of Arts - Ain Shams University – 1978. 
 Master of Arts in History – College of Arts – Ain Shams University – 1978 – his thesis: “Islamic and Christian Organizations in The Levant During The Crusades in 12th and 13th Centuries C.E.” 1984.  
 Doctor of Arts in history with Honours – Specializing in The Middle Ages – His thesis: “Foreign Policies of The Nuri State (541-569 A.H. / 1146-1174 C.E.)” in 1988.

Career Progression 
 Demonstrator in the College of Arts in Ain Shams University 1978–1984. 
 Teaching Assistant in the College of Arts in Ain Shams University 1984–1988. 
 Assistant Professor in the College of Arts in Ain Shams University 1998–2004. 
 Professor in the College of Arts in Ain Shams University 2004 – Present. 
 Professor in the University of Sharjah 2005 – Present.

Obtained Awards 
 Supreme Council of Arts and Humanities Award in Journalistic Article in 1975. 
 Certificate of Merit for being the Valedictorian of the College of Arts in Ain Shams University in 1977. 
 Certifictae of Merit of being the Valedictorian of Ain Shams University in 1978. 
 Certificate of Merit from The Egyptian Society of Historical Studies for obtaining Distinction with Honours in 1978.
 Certificate of Merti from The Arab Cultural Club in Sharjah in 2014. 
 Several honorary certificates from Sharjah Television. 
 Certificate of Appreciation from The College of Shari‘ah and Islamic Studies Society in University of Sharjah in 2013. 
 Abha Literary Club Award in the field of Historical Researches in 1993. 
 Certificate of Merit from Imam Muhammad Ibn Saud Islamic University – Kingdom of Saudi Arabia in 1997.  
 Plate Award from The Khorfakkan Culture, Public Arts, and Heritage Association for lecturing on the cultural and architectural urban achievements of His Highness Sheikh / Dr. Sultan Bin Muhammad Al-Qasimi in 2010. 
 College of Humanities Plate Award from University of Sharjah in The Field of Scientific Studies in 2012. 
 His students published a book in his honor called: ‘European Middle Ages and its Relation with The East’ edited by Dr. Muhammad Fawzi from the American University in Cairo, Dar Al-Adab, Cairo, 2013.

Scientific Associations Memberships 
 Member of The Egyptian Society of Historical Studies. 
 Member of The Arab Historiographers Federation. 
 Member of The Saudi Arabia Historical Society. 
 The Moroccan Historians' Association Membership. 
 Member of The Egyptian Geographic Society. 
 Founder of The Relations Between The East and The West in The Middle Ages seminar in the College of Humanities in Ain Shams University.  
 Participating in the Promotion Committee where he promoted around (20) members from the teaching board to Assistant Professors and Professors in King Faisal University, King Abdulaziz University in Saudi Arabia, University of Jordan, and Islamic University of Gaza.  
 Participating in dissertations discussions.

Scientific Productions

Books 
 European Travelers in The Kingdom of Jerusalem 1099–1187 C.E. or ‘Al-Raḥala Al-Oropeyoun Fi Mamlakat Bayt Al-Maqdis Al- Ṣalibiya 1099 – 1187 C.E.’ Cairo, 1991.  
 Geographers and Muslim Travelers in The Levant During The Crusades or ‘Al-Jughrafeyoun Wa Al-Raḥala Al-Muslemoun Fi Bilad Al-Sham Zaman Al-Ḥuroub Al- Ṣalibiya’, Cairo 1995.  
 The Norwegian King Sigurd and His Role in Supporting The Crusade 1111 – 1107 C.E. or ‘Al-Malek Al-Nawrwiji Sigurd Wa Dawruh Fi Daʿam Al-Ḥaraka Al- Ṣalibiya 1111 – 1107 C.E.’  Middle East and Futuristic Studies Center in Ain Shams University 1995.  
 Earthquakes in The Levant During The Crusades or ‘Al-Zalazel Fi Bilad Al-Sham ʿAṣr Al- Ḥuroub Al- Ṣalibiya’ Cairo 1996.  
 Bibliographical Chapters on The History of The Crusades or ‘Fusool Bibliographiya Fi Tareekh Al-Ḥuroub Al- Ṣalibiya’ Cairo 1996.  
 On The Christian-Islamic Conflict: Battle of Arsuf 1191 C.E. / 587 A.H. or ‘Fi Al-Ṣiraʿa Al-Islami Al-Ṣalibi: Maʿaraket Arsuf 1191 C.E. / 587 A.H.’ Cairo 1997.  
 Contributions of Arabic-Islamic Medicine in The Middle Ages or ‘Min Ishamat Al-Ṭib Al-ʿArabi Al-Islami Fi Al-ʿUsoor Al-Wusṭa’ Cairo 1997.  
 On The Christian-Islamic Conflict: Foreign Policies of The Nuri State 1146–1174 C.E. or ‘Fi Al-Ṣiraʿa Al-Islami Al-Ṣalibi: Al-Siyasa Al-Kharijiya Li Al-Dawla Al-Nuriya 1146 – 1174 C.E.’ Cairo 1998.  
 The Crusades: Historical and Critical Studies or ‘Al- Ḥuroub Al- Ṣalibiya: Dirasat Tarikhiya Wa Naqdiya’ Lebanon 1999.  
 Universities of The Islamic World: Challenges and Future Ambitions or ‘Jamiʿat Al-ʿAlam Al-ʿArabi: Mushkilat Al-Waqi ʿ Wa Afaq Al-Mustaqbal’ The United Islamic World Institute Conference, Malaysia 2008. 
 My Trip to Abha or ‘Riḥlati Ila Abha’ Cairo 1998.  
 The Crusades: Relations Between The East and The West During The 12th and 13th Centuries C.E. or 7th and 6th Centuries A.H. or ‘Al- Ḥuroub Al- Ṣalibiya: Al-ʿAlaqat Bayn Al-Sharq Wa Al-Gharb Fi Al-Qarnayn 13 – 12 C.E. / 7 – 6 A.H.’ Cairo 1999–2000. 
 On Historical Criticism or ‘Fi Al-Naqd Al-Tareekhi’ Cairo 2001. 
 The Crusades: Politics – Water – Creed or ‘Al- Ḥuroub Al- Ṣalibiya: Siyasa – Al-Miyah – Al- ʿAqida’ Cairo 2001. 
 Sindibad During The Crusades or ‘Sindibad Fi ʿAṣr Al- Ḥuroub Al- Ṣalibiya’ Cairo 2002. 
 Locust swarm raids and their impact on the Levant: the era of the Crusades 1114-1159 C.E. or ‘Egharat Asrab Al-Jarad Wa Atharaha Fi Bilad Al-Sham: ʿAṣr Al- Ḥuroub Al-Ṣalibiya, Dirasa ʿAan Al-Marḥala Min 1114 – 1159 C.E.’ Cairo 2002. 
 Crusader Religious Authorities in The Levant During The 12th and 13th Centuries C.E. or ‘Al-Hay’at Al-Diniya Al-Ḥarbiya Al-Ṣalibiya Fi Bilad Al-Sham Fi Al-Qarnayn 12th – 13th C.E.’ Oman 2003.  
 Editor of: On The History of The Middle Ages (Studies on Byzantium – The Crusades – Al-Andalus) or ‘Fi Tareekh Al-ʿ Ousoor Al-Wusṭa (Dirasat Fi Bizanṭa - Al- Ḥuroub Al-Ṣalibiya – Al-Andalus) Cairo 2003.  
 Editor of: Studies in The History of The Relations Between The East and The West (Middle Ages) or ‘Dirasat Fi Tareekh Al-ʿAlaqat Bayn Al-Sharq Wa Al-Gharb (Al-ʿ Ousoor Al-Wusṭa) Cairo 2003. 
 European Travelers in The Middle Ages or ‘Raḥala Al-Oropeyoun Fi Al-ʿ Ousoor Al-Wusṭa’ Cairo 2004. 
 Research in The History of The Middle Ages: Commemorative Book For Honoring Dr. Mahmoud Said Omran or ‘Kitab Buḥooth Fi Tareekh Al-ʿ Ousoor Al-Wusṭa’ Alexandria 2004.  
 Al-Zahir Baibars Founder of The Mamluk Sultanate in Egypt or ‘Al-Thahir Baibars Mu’asis Dawlat Salaṭin Al-Mamalik Fi Miṣr’ Cairo 2006. 
 Founders of Medicine in The Middle Ages or ‘Min Aʿalam Al-Ṭib Fi Al-ʿ Ousoor Al-Wusṭa’’ Cairo 2006. 
 Crusader Fortresses in The Levantine in 12th and 13th Centuries or ‘Al-Qilaʿa Fi Bilad Al-Sham Fi Al-Qarnayn 13th , 12th’ Cairo 2006. 
 The Nomads of The East and The West in The Middle Ages or ‘Min Raḥalat Al-Sharq Wa Al-Gharb Fi Al-ʿ Ousoor Al-Wusṭa’ Cairo 2006.  
 Egyptian Pioneering Historians in The Duration of The Middle Ages  or ‘Mu’arikhun Maṣriyun Ruwad Li Marḥalet Al-ʿ Ousoor Al-Wusṭa’ Cairo 2006 
 Byzantine Empire: Studies On The History of The Royal Families or ‘Al-Embraṭuriya Al-Bizanṭiya: Dirasat Fi Tareekh Al-‘Usar Al- Ḥakima’ Cairo 2007. 
 The Crusades: Researches and Articles or ‘ʿAṣr Al-Ḥuroob Al-Ṣalibiya: Buḥuth Wa Maqalat’ Cairo 2007. 
 The History of Egypt or ‘Miṣr Tarwi Tareekhaha’ Cairo 2008. 
 Salahuddin Ayubi: History and Legend or ‘Ṣalaḥ Al-Dein Al-Ayoubi: Bayn Al-Tareekh Wa Al-Usṭura’ Cairo 2008. 
 ʿAlya Al-Janzuri: A Pioneering Egyptian Historian in The Duration of The Middle Ages or ‘ʿAlya Al-Janzuri Mu’arekha Miṣriya Ra’eda Li Tareekh Al-ʿ Ousoor Al-Wusṭa’ Cairo 2008. 
 Forgive Me Asyut: Trip To The Capital of Upper Egypt Through History, Geography, And Literature or ‘Samiḥini Ya Asyut: Riḥla Ila ʿAṣimat Ṣaʿid Miṣr Bayn Al-Zaman Wa Al-Makan Wa Al-Kutub’ Cairo 2010.  
 My Trip With The Katameya Resident or ‘Riḥlati  Maʿa Sakin El Katameya’ Cairo 2010. 
 The Ottoman Empire: History and Civilization or ‘Al-Dawla Al-ʿOthmaniya: Tareekhaha Wa Ḥaḍaratiha’ Cairo 2010.  
 The Crusades: A Summary or ‘Al-Ḥuroob Al-Ṣalibiya: ʿArdh Muwjaz’ Cairo 2010.  
 The Crusades: Studies in Comparative History or ‘Al-Ḥuroob Al-Ṣalibiya: Dirasat Fi Al-Tareekh Al-Muqaran’ Cairo 2010. 
 Shedding The Light on The History of The Crusades or ‘Aḍwa’ ʿAla Tareekh Al-Ḥuroob Al-Ṣalibiya’ Ramallah 2011. 
 Mamluk Sultanate: History and Civilization or ‘Al-Mamalik: Tareekhuhom Wa Ḥaḍaratihom’ Cairo 2011.  
 A Trip to Salahuddin Ayubi or ‘Riḥla Ila Ṣalaḥ Al-Dein Al-Ayoubi’ Cairo 2011. 
 Islamic Civilization in The Middle Ages or ‘Fi Riḥab Al-Ḥaḍara Al-Islamiya Fi Al-ʿ Ousoor Al-Wusṭa’ Cairo 2011.  
 Editor of: Studies on The History of The Middle Ages: A Commemorative Book Honoring Afaf Sabra or ‘Dirasat Fi Tareekh Al-ʿ Ousoor Al-Wusṭa’ Cairo 2013.   
 Editor of: Researches and Studies On The History of The Middle Ages: A Commemorative Book Honoring The Historian: ʿAlya Al-Janzuri or ‘Buḥuth Wa Dirasat Fi Tareekh Al-ʿ Ousoor Al- Wusṭa’ Cairo 2013. 
 Editor of: Researches On The History of The Middle Ages: A Commemorative Book Honoring Dr, Zubayda ʿAṭa’ or ‘Buḥuth Fi Tareekh Dirasat Fi Tareekh Al-ʿ Ousoor Al-Wusṭa’  Cairo 2013.  
 Shedding New Lights On The Crusades or ‘Aḍwa’ Jadida ʿAla Al-Ḥuroob Al-Ṣalibiya’ Ramallah 2011.  
 Salahuddin Ayubi 1138–1193 C.E. : The Knight of The Crusades or ‘Ṣalaḥ Al-Dein Al-Ayoubi 1138 – 1193 C.E. : Fares ʿAṣr Al-Ḥuroob Al-Ṣalibiya’ Cairo 2012.  
 On Salahuddin Ayubi: Remarks From The East and The West or ‘Qalu ʿAan Ṣalaḥ Al-Dein Al-Ayoubi: Shahadat Min Al-Sharq Wa Al-Gharb’ Cairo 2013.  
 The Revolution of Egypt's Conscience or ‘Thawrat Ḍamir Miṣr Al-Khalida’ Cairo 2012.  
 Islam: Peace and Clarity or ‘Al-Islam: Noor W Hidaya’ Cairo 2012.  
 The History of Evergreen Tunisia or ‘Tunis Al-Khadra’ Tarwi Tareekhuha’. 
 Notable Figures of The Crusades or ‘Min Aʿalam ʿAṣr Al-Ḥuroob Al-Ṣalibiya’ Cairo 2013.  
 The History of The Crusades: World Conflict in The Middle Ages or ‘Tareekh Al-Ṣalibiyat Fi Al-ʿ Ousoor Al-Wusṭa’ Cairo 2011.  
 The History of Palestine or ‘Filisṭin Tarwi Tareekhuha’ Ramallah 2011.  
 Salahuddin Ayubi, The Knight of The Crusades: Opinions and Perceptions or ‘Ṣalaḥ Al-Dein Al-Ayoubi, Fares ʿAṣr Al-Ḥuroob Al-Ṣalibiya: Aara’ Wa Taṣuwurat’ Jerusalem 2013.  
 The Crusades: Bibliographical Studies or ‘Al-Ḥuroob Al-Ṣalibiya: Dirasat Bibliographiya’ Cairo 2013.  
 Shedding The Light on The Bibliography of The History of The Crusades or ‘Adwa’ ʿAla Bibliographiya Tareekh Al-Ḥuroob Al-Ṣalibiya’ Cairo 2013.  
 Egypt During 6 October 1973 or ‘Miṣr Wa Al-ʿOubur Ila Al-Karama: 6 October 1973’ Cairo 2013. 
 Presenting and Critiquing One Hundred Books About Salahuddin Ayubi or ‘Ma’at Kitab ʿAan Ṣalaḥ Al-Dein Al-Ayoubi: ʿArḍ Wa Naqd’ Cairo 2014. 
 Salahuddin Ayubi: Bibliographical Guide or ‘Ṣalaḥ Al-Dein Al-Ayoubi: Dalil Bibliography’ Ramallah 2014.  
 Defending Salahuddin Against Online Attacks or ‘Difaʿa ʿAan Ṣalaḥ Al-Dein Ḍid Muhjemeeh ʿAla Shabaket Al-Internet’ Cairo 2014. 
 The Crusades: European Colonialism in The Middle Ages – A Commemorative book honoring Dr. Isḥak ʿObaid or ‘ʿAṣr Al-Ḥuroob Al-Ṣalibiya: Ḥarakit Al-Istiʿmar Al-Europi Fi Dirasat Al-ʿ Ousoor Al-Wusṭa’ Cairo 2014. 
 I Knew Them or ‘ʿAraftu Ha’ula’’.  
 My Trip to Sharjah or ‘Riḥlati Ila Al-Shariqah’. 
 The Crusades in The Publications of Contemporary Egyptian Historians or ‘Al-Ḥuroob Al-Ṣalibiya Fi Mu’alafat Al-Mu’arikheen Al-Misriyeen Al-Muḥaditheen’ Cairo 2016. 
 The Crusades in The Publications of Contemporary Arab Historians or ‘Al-Ḥuroob Al-Ṣalibiya Fi Mu’alafat Al-Mu’arikheen Al- ʿArab Al-Muḥaditheen’ Cairo 2016. 
 The Crusades in The Publications of Contemporary European Historians or ‘Al-Ḥuroob Al-Ṣalibiya Fi Mu’alafat Al-Mu’arikheen Al-Europiyeen Al-Muḥaditheen’ Cairo 2016. 
 The Crusader Historian, Walim Al-Ṣuri (1186 C.E.): Arab and Western Perceptions or ‘Al-Mu’arekh Al-Ṣalibi, Walim Al-Ṣuri: Bayn Ro’yatayn ʿArabiya Wa Gharbiya’ Edited by Dr. Muḥammad Mu’nes Awadh and Dr. Hanadi Al-Sayed Maḥmoud, Cairo 2017. 
 The Speech of Pope Urban II in Clermont in 1095 C.E.: Researches and Studies  or ‘Khiṭab Al-Baba Urban Al-Thani Fi Clermont 1095 C.E. : Dirasat Wa Buḥuth’ Edited by Dr. Muḥammad Mu’nes Awadh and Dr. Hanadi Al-Sayed Maḥmoud, Cairo 2017. 
 Coptic Citizens Who Fell in Love with Their Motherland: Egypt or ‘Muwaṭinun Aqbaṭ ʿAshiqu Omahom Miṣr’ Cairo 2017. 
 My Journey With Salahuddin Ayubi: Fragments From Memory or ‘Riḥlati Maʿa Ṣalaḥ Al-Dein Al-Ayoubi: Qaṭarat Min Shalalat Al-Thakira’ Sharjah 2017. 
 History is A Woman: A Study on Salahuddin Ayubi (1138–1193 C.E.) or ‘Al-Tareekh Imra’a: Dirasa Li ʿAṣr Ṣalaḥ Al-Dein Al-Ayoubi (1138 – 1193 C.E.)’. 
 Salahuddin Ayubi (1138–1193 C.E.): In Arabic and Western Encyclopedias or ‘Ṣalaḥ Al-Dein Al-Ayoubi (1138 – 1193 C.E.): Fi Al-Mawsuʿat Al-ʿArabiya Wa Al-Gharbiya’ Al-Nour Publishing, Damascus 2019. 
 Salahuddin Ayubi (1138–1193 C.E.): Victories and Defeats or ‘Ṣalaḥ Al-Dein Al-Ayoubi (1138 – 1193 C.E.): Inkisarat Wa Inṭiṣarat’ Al-Nour Publishing, Damascus 2019.  
 Shining Suns in The Skies of Sharjah or ‘Shumoos Mushreqa Fi Sama’ Al-Shariqah’ Al-Nour Publishing, Damascus 2019. 
 Historical Studies Through The Ages: A commemorative book honoring the professor Dr. Jad Taha, the previous Dean of The College of Humanities in Ain Shams University or ‘Buḥuth Tareekhiya ʿAbr Al-ʿOuṣur’ Dar Al-Adab, Cairo 2019. Umm Kulthum: The Legend of Arabic Music or ‘Umm Kulthum: Usṭurat Al-Ghina’ Al-cArabi Wa Qitharit Al-Khuloud’ Dar Al-Adab, Cairo 2020.  
 Fragments of The World History of Salahuddin Ayubi: A Study of The Publications of Contemporary Western Historians or ‘Min Al-Tareekh Al-ʿAlami Li Ṣalaḥ Al-Dein Al-Ayoubi: Dirasa Li Mu’alafat Al-Mu’arikheen Al-Gharbiyeen Al-Muḥaditheen’ University of Sharjah, Sharjah 2020.  
 Muslims, Crusades, Byzantines: Studies dedicated to Dr. Ḥasan Abd Al-Wahab or ‘Muslimoon Wa Ṣalibiyun Wa Byzanṭiyun’ from The University of Alexandria, Dar Al-Adab, Cairo 2020. 
 The Crusades: Conflict From The Sea to The River or ‘Al-Ḥuroob Al-Ṣalibiya: Ṣiraʿ Al-Baḥr Wa Al-Nahr’ Al-Nour Publishing, Damascus 2020. 
 Muslims, Crusades, Byzantines: Studies dedicated to Dr. Ḥasan Abd Al-Wahab – Professor in The Field of The Middle Ages or ‘Muslimoon Wa Ṣalibiyun Wa Byzanṭiyun’ from The University of Alexandria, Dar Al-Adab, Cairo 2020. 
 Sheikh Dr. Sultan Al-Qasimi: An Egyptian Narration or ‘Miṣr Tarwi Qiṣit Sultan Al-Wafa’ Al-Sheikh Al-Doctor Sultan Al-Qasimi’ Al-Nour Publishing, Damascus 2020.  
 Salahuddin Ayubi (1138–1193 C.E.) or 
 ‘Ṣalaḥ Al-Dein Al-Ayoubi (1138 – 1193 C.E.): Ayam Farqiah Laha Tareekh’ Dar Al-Adab, Cairo 2020.  
 The Crusades Through The Jewish Genizah or ‘Al-Ḥuroob Al-Ṣalibiya: Khilal Watha’eq Al-Janizah Al-Yahudiya’ Al-Nour Publishing, Damascus 2020. 
 Salahuddin Ayubi (1138–1193 C.E.) or 
 ‘Ṣalaḥ Al-Dein Al-Ayoubi (1138 – 1193 C.E.): Ayam Farqiah Laha Tareekh’ Dar Al-Adab, Cairo 2020.  
 My Love for Egypt: An Autobiography or ‘ʿAshiqtuki Ya Miṣr: Sira Thatiya’ General Egyptian Book Organization, Cairo 2021.  
 Researches in The History of The Relations Between The East and The West – Dedicated to Dr. Hamid Ghanim Zayan or ‘Buḥuth Fi Tareekh Al-ʿAlaqat Bayn Al-Sharq Wa Al-Gharb’ Dar Al-Adab, Cairo 2021.  
 Historical Researches and Studies dedicated to Dr. Ismail Al-Bishri, Chancellor of Jouf University or ‘Buḥuth Wa Dirasat Tareekhiya’ Dar Al-Adab, Cairo 2021.  
 Historical Researches and Studies dedicated to Dr. Said Al-Omar, Chancellor of Northern Border University or ‘Buḥuth Wa Dirasat Tareekhiya’ Dar Al-Adab, Cairo 2021.

Researches Printed in English 
 HIGHLIGHTS ON MEDICAL CONTRIBUTION OF MAIMONIDES DURING THE AYYUBID RULE IN EGYPT. in: M. E. R. J., vol. 12, March 2003.

Researches and Studies 
 Bibliography of The Crusades ¬_ Arabic and Arabized Resources, Islamic and Middle History Seminar or ‘Nadwat Al-Tareekh Al-Islami Wa Al-Wasiṭ’ Volume 3, 1985.  
 Collective Source for The Nizari -Ismaili History in The Levantine During The 6th Century A.H. / 12th Century C.E. Cairo 1982.  
 The History of Arabic Medicine and The Position of Abdullatif Al-Baghdadi in it ¬_ Research in The History of Sciences For Arabs Conference¬_Syria, Raqqa 1991.  
 Sunni-Shi’ite Confrontation in The Levantine in The 6th Century A.H. / 12th Century C.E. Through The Journey of Ibn Jubair ¬_ Arabs and Asia Seminar, University of Cairo, April 1989.  
 Trading Markets During The Nuri State, Dar Al-Sunna Magazine (16) 3rd issue, 1411 A.H.  
 Walim Al-Ṣuri: Historian of The Southern Fortresses of The Crusader Kingdom of Jerusalem 1137–1154 C.E. Middle East Research Center in Ain Shams University 1995.  
 Shedding The Light on Medicine on Crusader Regions 1098–1174 C.E. Middle East Research Center in Ain Shams University 1995. 
 Great Aleppo As A Source For The History of The Levantine During The Crusades, Middle East Research Center in Ain Shams University 1998.  
 Critical Study of Al-Suyuti's Thesis: Kashf Al- Ṣalṣala ʿAan Waṣf Al-Zalzala’ Cairo 1998.  
 Shedding The Lights on The Crusader Beerah, Middle East Research Center in Ain Shams University 2002. 
 Fish in The Levantine During The Crusades ¬_ A Study in The Economical and Social History, Cairo 2002.  
 Persecution of Jews By The Crusades in The Rhine Basin in Germany in 1097 C.E. Applied Study on The Yearbook of Al-Ruba Aliʿazr  Bar Natan. Middle East Research Center in Ain Shams University 2002.  
 Factors That Led to The Failing of The Crusader Project on The Lower East in The Centuries 7th A.H. / 13th C.E. Middle East Research Center in Ain Shams University 2002.  
 Role of Water in The History of The Crusaders from 1098 to 1187 C.E. Middle East Research Center in Ain Shams University 2002.  
 Hasan Habashi: Pioneering Historian of The Middle Ages. ‘The Relations Between The East and The West in The Middle Ages’ Seminar ¬_ College of Humanities ¬_ Ain Shams University 2005.  
 Ahmad Fou’ad Sayed: Historian of Islamic Egypt. ‘The Relations Between The East and The West in The Middle Ages’ Seminar ¬_ College of Humanities ¬_ Ain Shams University 2005. 
 Chapters From The History of The Crusades Co-authored With Dr. Said Al-Bishawi, Oman 2005.  
 The Crusades As A Border Between The East and The West in The Middle Ages and Its Results _ Islamic World Union Conference _ Malaysia 2006.  
 The Radical Role of The Palestinian Woman in Facing Zionism_ Islamic World Union Conference _ Malaysia 2007.  
 820 Years Since The Battle of Hattin ¬_ Al-Manbar Al-Jamiʿi Journal, Issue (48) May 2007.  
 Spreading of Islam in The Lines of The Crusades in The Levantine Between The Centuries 12th – 13th C.E. Al-Manbar Al-Jamiʿi Journal, Issue (49) September 2007 
 Salahuddin Ayyubi and The Third Crusade _ Al-Manbar Al-Jamiʿi Journal, November 2007.   
 (1171-1204 C.E.) Critical Stage in The History of The Crusades East of The Mediterranean and East of Europe. Arabs and Global Challenges Through The Ages Seminar – College of Arts – University of Cairo 2007.  
 Social Criticism Through The Writings of Walim Al- Ṣuri, Comparative Study of The History of The Crusades. Arab Historians Union Seminar on The Studies of The Social History of The Arab World Through The Ages, Cairo 2008.  
 Universities of The Islamic World: Current Challenges and Future Ambitions, Islamic World Union Institute Conference – Malaysia 2008.  
 Sufism in The Levant During The Crusades – A part of the book: ‘Studies in The Relations Between The East and The West (The Middle Ages) honoring the professor and Dr. Ishak Obaid Cairo 2004.  
 The Idea of Islamic Jihad in The Levant During The Crusades.  
 Shedding The Light on The History of The Maronites in Lebanon During The Crusades – A part of the book: Researches in The History of The Middle Ages honoring the professor and Dr. Qasim Abduh Qasim, Cairo 2004. 
 The Perspective of Coptic Historians on The Crusades – Chosen examples from Middle East Research Center Magazine – Ain Shams University, March issue 2008.  
 The Journeys of Ibn Jubair (1217) and Burckhardt From Mount Zion (1283) in The Levant – A comparative study in Middle East Research Center Magazine – Ain Shams University, March issue 2008.   
 Salahuddin Ayyubi _ Al-Khafji Magazine 1995.  
 The Crusaders Learning Arabic Medicine in The Levant in The 12th Century C.E. Al-Manbar Al-Jamiʿi Journal, February issue 2008.  
 Salahuddin Ayyubi and The Third Crusade, Al-Manbar Al-Jamiʿi Journal, November 2007.  
 The Crusades As A Colonial Movement and A Study of Jamal Hamdan's View (1928–1995), Middle East Researches Magazine, issue 27, September 2009.  
 Ra’uf Abbas (1939–2008) The Knight of Port Said – A part of the commemorative honorary book published by The Egyptian Society of Historical Studies, Cairo 2009.  
 Salahuddin Ayyubi's Will (1193 C.E.) For His Son: Al-Zahir Ghazi – An Analytical Study. Middle East Researches Magazine – Middle East Research Center – Ain Shams University – Issue of September 2009.  
 Treaty of Ramla (1192) and Treaty of Jaffa (1229): A Comparative Study of The Diplomatic History of The Ayyubid Dynasty. A research prepared to participate in The Arab Historians Union Conference 2009, Cairo.   
 Nūr al-Dīn Maḥmūd (1146–1174 C.E.) A Hero From The Time of The Crusades. Al-Waiʿi Al-Tareekhi Magazine. Issue (5), March 2009.  
 Laila Abdel Jawad: A Pioneering Egyptian Historian in The History of The Middle Ages. Memorial Celebration 14/3/2009 in The University of Cairo.  
 The First Abbasid Era: An audio book released by Grand Hayat, Cairo 2009.  
 Presenting Muhammad Al-Muqaddam's Book: Assassinations in The Levant and Arabia During The Crusades. Cairo, 2009. Al-Waiʿi Al-Tareekhi Magazine, issue (6), April 2009.  
 Presenting Safa’ Othman's Book: The Crusader Kingdom of Jerusalem During The Era of Baldwin II (1118–1131 C.E.) Cairo 2008. Al-Waiʿi Al-Tareekhi Magazine, issue (6), April 2009. 
 Hussam Al-Dein Lu’lu’: A Navy Captain From The Ayyubid Era – A study of his role in the era of The Crusades.  
 Adel Ghunaim: An Ever-giving River – A part of the commemorative book honoring him – Cairo 2004.  
 60 Years Since Palestine Was Stolen: The Crime Continues – Al-Manbar Al-Jamiʿi Journal, September issue, 2008.  
 The Crusades As A Colonial Movement – A study of Jamal Hamdan's View (1928–1995), Middle East Researches Magazine, Issue (27), September 2010.  
 A Maronite Perspective on The History of The Crusades in The Levant in The 12th and 13th Centuries C.E. Middle East Researches Magazine, issue (27), September 2010.  
 Muhammad Bin Abdullah (PBUH) The Prophet Who Saved Humanity.  
 Al-Fandalawi and Al-Halhuli: Two National Heroes During The Era of The Crusades – A part of the commemorative book honoring Dr. Hassanein Rabiʿi, Cairo 2009.  
 An Israeli Historian Acknowledges and Admits The Israeli Genocide Against Palestinians in 1948, Al-Manbar Al-Jamiʿi Journal, February issue, 2008.  
 Marginalized Figures From The Era of The Crusades, Al-Waiʿi Al-Tareekhi Magazine (10th issue, February 2010). 
 Notable Historian: Shakir Mustafa (1912–2010) Al-Waiʿi Al-Tareekhi Magazine (10th issue, February 2010). 
 The Palestinian Historian: Dr. Muhammad Issa Salihiya (1941–2010) “May He Rest in Peace” Al-Waiʿi Al-Tareekhi Magazine (10th issue, February 2010). 
 The Palestinian Thinker: Anis Sayegh (1931–2009) “Goodbye”, Waiʿi Al-Tareekhi Magazine (10th issue, February 2010). 
 Crusader Genocide Against Muslims in The Levant Between 1098 and 1191 C.E. Picked examples. Middle East Researches Magazine, September 2010.  
 Solar Eclipse During 1124: An Astronomical Study in The History of The Crusaders. Middle East Researches Magazine, September 2010.  
 The Arab Thinker: Dr. Fo’uad Zakariya. Fo’uad Zakariya Seminar, Sultan Bin Ali Al Owais Cultural Foundation, Dubai 21-22/9/2010.  
 The Role of Dreams in The History of The Crusaders in The Levant During The Period Between 1098 and 1212 C.E. Middle East Researches Center Magazine, March 2012.  
 Salahuddin Ayyubi: A Chronological Bibliography (1902–2011 C.E.) Middle East Researches Center Magazine, March 2012.  
 Challenges That The Crusades Faced in The Levant During The 12th and 13th Centuries and Their Reflections on The Arab-Israeli Conflict, Middle East Researches Center Magazine, September 2012.  
 Tunisia: The Furthest Point of The Crusader Exapnsions During The Period Between 1097 and 1291 C.E. Middle East Researches Center Magazine, September 2012.  
 Bab Al-Shaghur Engravements in Damascus in 1154 C.E. As a source for the history of The Crusades, Middle East Researches Center Magazine, March 2013.  
 Feminist Narration of The History of The Crusades: A Bibliographical Report on The Contributions of Female Egyptians Historians Between 1999 and 2012, Middle East Researches Magazine, 2013.  
 Nūr al-Dīn Maḥmūd 1146-1174 C.E. : A Bibliographical Presentation On The Period Between 1945 and 2012, Middle East Researches Magazine, 2013.  
 Crusader Genocides in Germany, The Levant, And Egypt 1096-1191 C.E. Al-Manbar Al-Jamiʿi, 2012.  
 Salahuddin Ayyubi And His Time Management in The Conflict With The Crusaders 1170-1192 C.E. Al-Manbar Al-Jamiʿi, 2012. 
 Issa Al-Awam: A Muslim Navy Hero From The Era of The Crusades, Al-Manbar Al-Jamiʿi, 2012. 
 Salahuddin Ayyubi: A Charismatic Leader From The Era of The Crusades, Al-Manbar Al-Jamiʿi, 2012. 
 Raful Bint Abi Al-Jaysh: A Levantine Girl From The Era of The Crusades, Al-Manbar Al-Jamiʿi, 2012. 
 Encyclopedia of The History of The Crusades: A Critical Presentation, Middle East Studies Magazine, 2014.  
 From The Recordings of The Jewish Genizah During The Era of The Crusades – Letter of Mousa Bin Maymoun (1204 C.E.) to Samuel Bin Tabun (1230 C.E.) Middle East Researches Center Magazine 2013.  
 Disabled People From The Era of The Crusades: Salahuddin Ayyubi Being An Example. Middle East Researches Magazine, 2014.  
 Salahuddin Ayyubi: A Charismatic Leader From The Era of The Crusades, Middle East Researches Magazine, 2015.  
 Salahuddin Ayyubi Critics. Middle East Researches Magazine, 2015.  
 The Pleasing Study of Salahuddin Ayyubi. Middle East Researches Center Magazine, 2015.  
 The Crusader Aggression Against Hijaz in The Ayyubid Era, New Information About The 1113 C.E. Movement. Middle East Researches Center Magazine, 2016.  
 Battles of Myriokephalon 1176 C.E. and Montgisard 1177 C.E. A Byzantinian and Ayyubid Defeats: A Comparative Study. Middle East Researches Center Magazine, 2016. 
 Introducing the Israeli Historian Joshua Prawer 1990, Middle East Researches Center Magazine, 2017.  
 The Israeli Historian: Benjamin Kedar, His Publications on The Crusades. Middle East Researches Center 2017.  
 The Historian: Aria Jrabou and His Publications On European History. Middle Researches Center Magazine 2017.  
 Three British Female Historians in The History of The Crusades – Rosaline Hill, Carol Hillenbrand, And Susan Edington. Middle East Researches Center Magazine, 2017.  
 Dr. Hassan Habashi 1915–2005, Historian in The Crusades. Middle East Researches Magazine, 14th issue. March 2017.  
 Dr. Ishak Obaid: Historian in The Crusades. Middle East Researches – Ain Shams University- Magazine – September issue, 2017.  
 Dr. Joseph Nasim Yousef (1925–1993) Historian in The Crusades. Middle East Researches Magazine – Ain Shams University – September issue, 2017.  
 Dr. Omar Kamal Tawfiq (1923–1988) Historian in The Crusades. Middle East Researches Magazine – Ain Shams University – June issue, 2017.  
 Dr. Muhammad Mustafa Ziyada (1900–1968) A Historian in The Crusades – Middle East Researches Magazine – Ain Shams University – June issue, 2017.  
 Nazir Hassan Saadawi (1914–1968) A Historian in The Crusades, Middle East Researches Magazine, 45th issue, March 2018.  
 Dr. Said Abdel Fattah Ashur (1928–2009) A Historian in The Crusades, Eastern Researches Magazine, 46th issue, July 2018.  
 Said Ashur: Historian in The Crusades. Middle East Studies Center Magazine, Ain Shams University, 46th issue, 2018.  
 Nikita Elisseeff: Historian in The Crusades. Middle East Researches Center Magazine, Ain Shams University, 50th issue, 2019.  
 Letter of The Egyptian Prince in The Crusader Prisons in Nablus  To His Family in Fustat Found Through Genizah Recordings (1177-1186 C.E.) . Middle East Researches Center Magazine, Ain Shams University, 50th issue, 2019.  
 Ecumenical Councils in Western Europe  (1095-1312 C.E.) From The Perspective of The Egyptian Historian. University of Cairo, 54th issue, January 2019.  
 Shedding The Light on The Danish King Eric I (1095-1103 C.E.), The Egyptian Historian, University of Cairo, 54th issue, July 2019.  
 Philip Hitti: Historian in The Crusades. Middle East Researches Center Magazine, Ain Shams Magazine, 48th issue, 2019.  
 Mikhail Zaborov (1909–1991): Historian in The Crusades.  Middle East Researches Center Magazine, Ain Shams Magazine, 48th issue, 2019 
 James Stone: Historian in The Crusades.  Middle East Researches Center Magazine, Ain Shams Magazine, 48th issue, 2019 
 Conflict Between The Sea and The River “A New Theory For Studying The History of The Crusaders in The East”. College of Arts Magazine, Asyut University, 96th issue, 2019.  
 Francesco Gabrieli: Historian in Salahuddin Ayyubi. Middle East Researches Center Magazine, Ain Shams Magazine, 52nd issue, November 2019.  
 Joshua Prawer (1917–1990): Historian in Salahuddin Ayyubi. Middle East Researches Center Magazine, Ain Shams Magazine, 53rd issue, January 2020. 
 Claude Cahen (1909–1991): Historian in The Crusades. Middle East Researches Center Magazine, Ain Shams Magazine, 54th issue, March 2020. 
 Michele Amari (1806–1881): Historian in Salahuddin Ayyubi. Middle East Researches Center Magazine, Ain Shams Magazine, 55th issue, May 2020. 
 Rene Grousset (1885–1952): Historian in Salahuddin Ayyubi. Middle East Researches Center Magazine, Ain Shams Magazine, 56th issue, July 2020. 
 Shedding The Light on The Jerusalem Genocide 15–25 July 1099 C.E. Through Jewish Genizah Recordings. Middle East Researches Center Magazine, Ain Shams Magazine, 58th issue, July 2020 
 P.H. Newby: Historian in Salahuddin Ayyubi (1183-1193 C.E.). Middle East Researches Center Magazine, Ain Shams Magazine, 57th issue, 2021. 
 Blood-Shed Between Sufis and Crusades in Hijaz and Palestine During The Period Between 1183 and 1187 C.E. Middle East Researches Center Magazine, Ain Shams Magazine, 60th issue, 2021. 
 Generational Gap Between The Crusades And Muslims in The Levant (1174-1229 C.E.). Egyptian Historian Magazine, University of Cairo, 58th issue, January 2021.  
 Critiquing Hasan Al-Amin's Perspective on Salahuddin Ayyubi (1138-1193 C.E.). Egyptian Historian Magazine, University of Cairo, 59th issue, July 2021 
 Salahuddin Ayyubi (1138-1193 C.E.) in The Writings of Female Palestinian Historians: Picked Excerpts. Middle East Researches Center Magazine, Ain Shams University, 62nd issue, 2021.  
 Salahuddin Ayyubi (1138-1193 C.E.) in The Writings of Female Egyptian Historians: Picked Excerpts. Middle East Researches Center Magazine, Ain Shams University, 64th issue, November 2021. 
 Vision of Abbas Mahmoud Al-Aqqad (1889-1964 C.E.) of Salahuddin Ayyubi (1138-1193 C.E.). Middle East Researches Center Magazine, Ain Shams University, 61st issue, April 2022. 
 Salahuddin Ayyubi (1138-1193 C.E.): From The Perspective of Modern Coptic Historians: Picked Excerpts. Middle East Researches Center Magazine, Ain Shams University, 63rd issue, October 2022 
 Salahuddin Ayyubi (1138-1193 C.E.): From The Writings of Female Emirati Historians: Picked Excerpts. Middle East Researches Center Magazine, Ain Shams University, 65th issue, 2022 
 Indian Perspective on The History of The Crusades During The Period (1095-1193 C.E.) Middle East Researches Center Magazine, Ain Shams University, 66th issue, January 2022 
 The Crusades From The Writings of Emirati Historians: Picked Excerpts. Middle East Researches Center Magazine, Ain Shams University, 71st issue, February 2022. 
 The Crusades From The Writings of Algerian Historians: Picked Excerpts. Middle East Researches Center Magazine, Ain Shams University, 72nd issue, March 2022. 
 Salahuddin Ayyubi (1138-1193 C.E.): From The Writings of The Algerian Historian Awad Al-Munawir. Middle East Researches Center Magazine, Ain Shams University, 73rd Edition, March 2022.  
 Critiquing The Perspective of The Korean Historian, Park Jung-Soo of Salahuddin Ayyubi (1138-1193 C.E.). Middle East Researches Center Magazine, Ain Shams University, 74th Edition, April 2022. 
 Depiction of Salahuddin Ayyubi (1138–1193 C.E.) From The Chinese Historian Jeong Su-il. Middle East Researches Center Magazine, Ain Shams University, 75th Edition, May 2022.

Resources 
 The publications of the Dr. and PhD Muhammad Mou'nes Awadh mentioned above.  
 Theses Guide of The College of Arts in Ain Shams University. 
 Theses Guide of The College of Arts in Asyut University.  
 Scholarly Theses Guide in The University of Sharjah. 
 Scholarly Magazine of The College of Arts of Asyut University.  
 Middle East Researches and Futuristic Studies Center Magazine, Ain Shams University.

References 

20th-century Egyptian historians
1956 births
Ain Shams University alumni
Academic staff of the University of Sharjah
Living people
21st-century Egyptian historians